The City of Toledo Department of Fire & Rescue Operations, or simply Toledo Fire & Rescue Department provides fire protection and emergency medical services for Toledo, Ohio. The department was established on November 27, 1837.

Stations and apparatus 

As of March 2019, the complete list of stations and apparatus, broken down by battalion, is listed below.

Toledo Fire & Rescue paramedics staff 5 full-time Lucas County Life Squads and Life Squad 11, which is in-service from 7a.m. to 10p.m. daily. At 10p.m., Medic 3 (BLS) goes in-service until 7a.m.
Truck 13 and Truck 25 are "ghost trucks," put into service when staffing allows or the number of available trucks in the city necessitate.

References

External links
 
 Toledo Fire & Rescue Department on Facebook
 Toledo Firefighters Museum
 Toledo Fire & Rescue Department Recruitment on Facebook
 Swanson Fire Photography

Government of Toledo, Ohio
Fire departments in Ohio